Kiss Me, Kate is a 1948 musical by Cole Porter.

Kiss Me Kate may also refer to:

 Kiss Me, Kate (album), a 1949 album of songs from the musical, recorded by Jo Stafford
 Kiss Me Kate (film), a 1953 film version of the musical
 Kiss Me Kate (1968 film), a 1968 TV movie adaptation of the musical
 Kiss Me Kate (TV series), a British situation comedy
 Kiss Me Kate (horse), an American Thoroughbred racehorse named the 1951 American Champion Three-Year-Old Filly
 Kiss Me Kate, a 2009 EP by Kate Tsui